Martin Lynch, (aka Martin Lynch fitz James, i.e., Martin son of James Lynch), Mayor of Galway 1537-38.

Lynch was Mayor when Galway was visited by Lord Deputy of Ireland, Leonard Grey, on 11 July 1538. This was the first visit of a King's Deputy to the town, and marked the start of closer relations between the sometimes-beleaguered town and the Anglo-Irish administration in Dublin. He was lavishly entertained and stayed for seven days.

Town statues during Lynch's term included one regulating sanctuary seekers, their goods and debts. Lynch may have been the father of a later Mayor, Ambrose Lynch fitz Martin, who served the term 1558-59.

References
 History of Galway, James Hardiman, Galway, 1820.
 Old Galway, Maureen Donovan O'Sullivan, 1942.
 The Tribes of Galway, Adrian James Martyn, Galway, 2001.
 Role of Honour:The Mayors of Galway City 1485-2001, by William Henry, Galway, 2002.  

Mayors of Galway
16th-century Irish politicians